VOX TALENT  is Canada's non-union voiceover talent agency representing over 200 of Canada's voiceover actors and supplying voiceover talent to advertising agencies, independent producers, corporate marketing departments, producers and casting directors.

Companies based in Toronto
Mass media companies established in 1996